The Borscht Corporation is a 501(c)(3) nonprofit that creates short films and videos in and about the city of Miami, Florida. In addition to hosting a quasi-annual film festival that screens their work, Borscht Corp. provides financial and technical support to its commissioned filmmakers.

Since receiving a challenge grant from the John S. and James L. Knight Foundation in 2010, Borscht Corp. has spearheaded productions by untested moviemakers and provided a creative platform for underrepresented (often Latin American) identities in film.

Reception 
Borscht Corp. productions have seen media coverage from sites, television networks, and publications as varied as Art Papers, CBS News, Interview, The New Yorker and VICE.

Their work has screened at hundreds of venues worldwide, from the Museum of Modern Art and the Guggenheim in New York City to the AFI, Rotterdam International, Sundance, SXSW, Toronto International, Tribeca, and Venice Film Festivals.

In 2015, Borscht Corp. was the subject of two retrospectives: one at the CERN in Geneva, Switzerland as part of the Cineglobe International Film Festival, and another at the Independent Filmmaker Project's Media Center in Brooklyn, New York. The Los Angeles County Museum of Art (LACMA) will host a Borscht Corp. retrospective in 2016.

Thirteen of Borscht Corp.'s core members and alumni—Bernardo Britto, Lucas Leyva, Jillian Mayer, Terence Nance, Celia Rowlson-Hall, Marnie Ellen Hertzler, Barry Jenkins, Alex Lim Haas, Robin Comisar, Sam Kuhn, Faren Humes, Keisha Rae Witherspoon and Sebastián Silva—have been named to Filmmaker Magazine's annual list of the 25 New Faces of Independent Film.

Three were named to the New York Times' list of 20 Directors to Watch in 2013—Barry Jenkins, Terence Nance, and Sebastián Silva.

Accolades 

Borscht Corp. has received grants from the John S. and James L. Knight Foundation, Creative Capital, and Time Warner OneFifty.

Bernardo Britto's animated shorts Places Where We Lived and Yearbook were both awarded the Animated Short Grand Jury Prize at the AFI Fest in 2013 and 2014, respectively. His short film Glove received the Animated Short Grand Jury Award at the 2016 SXSW Film Festival.

Britto's animated short Yearbook received the Short Film Jury Prize at the Sundance Film Festival in 2014.

Jillian Mayer and Lucas Leyva's (collectively Mayer\Leyva) short video Scenic Jogging was selected by the Guggenheim Museums in New York, Berlin, Bilbao, and Venice to be a part of their YouTube PLAY exhibition in 2010.

Mayer\Leyva's short films Life & Freaky Times of Uncle Luke and #PostModem were finalists for the Short Film Grand Jury Prize at the 2012 and 2013 Sundance Film Festivals. In 2015, Mayer\Leyva's web series NO SEASONS—produced in association with MTV—received a Webby Award for Outstanding Reality Series.

Short films 
Borscht Corporation holds open calls asking for project ideas from artists from, living in, or inspired by Miami. They seek out both first-time filmmakers from the community and invite guest filmmakers to collaborate.

Twenty short films commissioned by Borscht Corp. have screened at the Sundance Film Festival, with two of them winning Jury Prizes.

In each of the 2016 and 2018 editions of Sundance, Borscht had four projects in competition.

Fourteen Borscht Corp short films have screened at SXSW Film Festival, with three winning jury prizes.

Eight Borscht Corporation short films have screened at AFI Fest, with three winning jury prizes.

Ten Borscht Corp short films have been acquired by The Criterion Collection and are streaming on The Criterion Channel.

As of 2018, Borscht Corp shorts have collectively won fifty-one awards at film festivals.

At least twenty-one Borscht Corp commissions have been selected as Vimeo Staff Picks.

Borscht Film Festival 
Borscht Corp. hosts a quasi-annual film festival in Miami that functions as a venue to share their work. Named one of the 25 Coolest Film Festivals in the World by MovieMaker Magazine, the Borscht Film Festival has simultaneously been hailed as "the weirdest film festival on the planet."

References 

Film production companies of the United States
Companies based in Miami